The prolactin receptor (PRLR) is a type I cytokine receptor encoded in humans by the PRLR gene on chromosome 5p13-14. It is the receptor for prolactin (PRL). The PRLR can also bind to and be activated by growth hormone (GH) and human placental lactogen (hPL). The PRLR is expressed in the mammary glands, pituitary gland, and other tissues. It plays an important role in lobuloalveolar development of the mammary glands during pregnancy and in lactation.

Structure 
The prolactin receptor (PRLR) is a membrane-bound protein of the cytokine receptor superfamily. In humans, it is encoded by a single gene which contains 11 exons and is located on chromosome 5. PRLR expression can be found in several tissues such as the gonads, breast, uterus, heart, liver, kidney, brain, immune cells, as well as adrenal and pituitary glands.

Several PRLR isoforms have been described in different tissues. These have varying lengths and cytoplasmic domain composition, but share identical extracellular domains, which are the regions binding to PRLR.

Diversity of PRLR is a result of transcription initiation in different sites of the PRLR promoter region. Additionally, post-translational modifications, like alternative splicing are the events that result in the different isoforms that allow for all the different actions of prolactin in the body.

Signaling
The PRLR is a class 1 cytokine receptor that uses messenger pathways to control cell proliferation, migration, intracellular ion concentration and inhibit programmed cell death (apoptosis). PRLRs also have functions in the second messenger cascades, including:

 JAK-STAT pathway – the STAT protein family has been shown to have a key transduction role in cytokine receptor signalling; this pathway is initiated following the activation of PRLRs. Although there have been 4 STAT proteins identified as transducer molecules of PRLR, STAT5 is recognised as the most important transducer of PRLR isoforms, with a role in inhibiting regulation of gene transcription.
 Ras-Raf-MAPK – initiated by PRLR activation. Phosphotyrosine residues on PRLR act as binding sites for adapter proteins – these connect PRLR to the Ras/Raf/MAP kinase cascade
 JAK-RUSH pathway 
 PI3K/AKT/mTOR pathway

Function 
Expression of the PRLR protein is found within cells of the mammary glands in accordance with its role in lactation, but also is the subject of attention for its diverse and emerging roles by its expression in adipose tissue, pancreatic islet cell proliferation, and immune responses. The PRLR has been found to be essential for lobuloalveolar maturation of the mammary glands during pregnancy, as evidenced by the fact that PRLR knockout mice show severely impaired development of lobuloalveolar structures. Disruption of PRLR signaling pathways have been linked to tumorigenesis and breast cancer development.

Ligands

Agonists
 Prolactin
 Growth hormone
 Human placental lactogen
 Placental growth hormone
 S179D-hPRL

Antagonists
Prolactin receptor antagonists such as Del1-9-G129R-hPRL have been developed.

Dopamine agonists are currently the most common methods used for treating hyperprolactinemia. However, since dopamine agonists only negatively regulate prolactin production from the pituitary gland, a few studies have tried to develop prolactin receptor antagonists for potentially treating the dopamine-resistant local hyperprolactinemia. Δ1–9-G129R-hPRL is one of the prolactin receptor antagonists been studied. Δ1–9-G129R-hPRL as a mutant (inactivated) form of prolactin which exerts its antagonist effect by competing with prolactin to bind with prolactin receptors; thereby, inhibiting the agonist effects of prolactin on prolactin receptors. Besides molecular antagonists, antibodies can also potentially be used to inhibit prolactin receptor signaling. LFA102 is a monoclonal antibody that has been studied and tested for disrupting prolactin receptor's signaling in breast cancers and prostate cancers. Although LFA102 has been proved sufficient to reduce prolactin receptor signaling based on in vitro and in vivo (mouse) studies, LFA102 likely has low effects on limiting tumor growth (breast and prostate cancer) as shown in phase I clinical trials.

Prolactin receptor dysfunction 
PRLR dysfunction has been seen to positively regulate the proliferation of malignant cells in breast cancer. Defects on prolactin receptor signalling can trigger tumour activity, rather than suppress. Signal control is monitored by a variety of genes, and the PRLR gene has been identified in the tissue of metastatic primary breast cancer cells. The defect in the gene is thought to have built a resistance to chemotherapy, and has lost the ability to regulate the apoptosis of cells with mutated DNA. This signalling defect then fails to promote the cellular differentiation, and promotes the upstream survival of the cancerous cells. In breast cancer, the survival of the breast epithelial cells resemble the malignant cells, characteristically known to have an increased proliferative rate.

See also 
 Prolactin modulator
 Hypothalamic–pituitary–prolactin axis

References

External links